Dendrosenecio kilimanjari is a giant groundsel found on Mount Kilimanjaro in Africa, below .

Taxonomy
It was originally known as Senecio kilimanjari, but a recent botanical reclassification split off some species formerly in Senecio, putting it and various other species in the new genus Dendrosenecio. Both genera are in the  family Asteraceae. The giant groundsels of the genus Dendrosenecio evolved, about a million years ago, from a Senecio that established itself on Mount Kilimanjaro, with those that survived adapting into Dendrosenecio kilimanjari. This later colonised other mountains by some means - the standard distance for wind dispersal of seeds is a few metres - and these isolated populations adapted in ways different from the parent population, creating new species.

Infraspecific name synonymy 
The infraspecific names for the giant groundsels have become somewhat confusing:
Dendrosenecio kilimanjari (Mildbr.) E.B.Knox subsp. cottonii (Hutch. & G.Taylor) E.B.Knox
Dendrosenecio johnstonii (Oliv.) B.Nord. subsp. cottonii (Hutch. & G.Taylor) B.Nord.  
Senecio cottonii Hutch. & G.Taylor  
Senecio johnstonii Oliv. subsp. cottonii (Hutch. & G.Taylor) Mabb.  
Senecio johnstonii Oliv. var. cottonii (Hutch. & G.Taylor) C.Jeffrey 
Dendrosenecio kilimanjari (Mildbr.) E.B.Knox subsp. kilimanjari
Senecio johnstonii Oliv. var. kilimanjari (Mildbr.) C.Jeffrey  
Senecio kilimanjari Mildbr.

References

External links
 
 

kilimanjari
Endemic flora of Tanzania
Mount Kilimanjaro
Afromontane flora
Plants described in 1922